Crouch and Wilson was an architectural practice based in Melbourne, Australia in the late nineteenth century. The partnership, between Tasmanian-born Thomas Crouch and recently arrived Londoner Ralph Wilson, commenced in 1857 in Elizabeth Street.
The firm designed numerous prominent Melbourne buildings including many Presbyterian and Wesleyan churches.
After the deaths of the partners in the late 1880s,  their sons continued on with the business until its closure in 1916.

Selected works

Prahran Town Hall, Chapel Street, Prahran,1861
Durham Street Methodist Church, Christchurch, 1864
Victorian School for the Deaf, St Kilda Road, 1866-71
Royal Victorian Institute for the Blind, St Kilda Road, 1868
Weslyan Methodist Church, 209 Davey St, Hobart, 1870  
Chinese Mission Church, Little Bourke Street,1872
Hawksburn Primary School, Malvern Road, Hawksburn, 1874
Church Of The Immaculate Conception, Hawthorn, 1867.
Colombo Street Methodist Church, Christchurch, New Zealand, 1877 (demolished)
East Melbourne Synagogue, 1877
Methodist Ladies' College, Hawthorn, 1882
The Homeopathic Hospital (later Prince Henry's Hospital), St Kilda Road, (demolished),1882-4

Gallery

References

Architecture firms of Australia
Organisations based in Melbourne
Architecture firms based in Victoria (Australia)